Jean Capelle (26 October 1913 – 20 February 1977) was a Belgian international footballer who played professionally as a striker for Standard Liège, scoring 245 goals in 285 appearances between 1929 and 1944. Capelle made his international debut in 1931, aged 17 years and 153 days. He also played at the 1934 FIFA World Cup as well as the 1938 FIFA World Cup.

References

External links
 Standard Liège profile 
 

1913 births
1977 deaths
Belgian footballers
Belgium international footballers
Standard Liège players
1934 FIFA World Cup players
1938 FIFA World Cup players
Footballers from Liège
Association football forwards
Walloon sportspeople